the Bukhtivets waterfall is located on the Bukhtivets River, near the village of Bukove, Nadvirna Raion, Ivano-Frankivsk Oblast.

See also
 Waterfalls of Ukraine

References 

Waterfalls of Ukraine